Shang Hong (born October 1960) is a Chinese venereologist who specializes in HIV/AIDS. She has been vice-president of China Medical University and its First Affiliated Hospital. She is vice-president of Chinese Association of STD and AIDS Prevention and Control.

Biography
Shang was born in Liaoning in October 1960. In 2008 he became a member of the 11th National Committee of the Chinese People's Political Consultative Conference. In January 2018 he was elected a member of the 13th National Committee of the Chinese People's Political Consultative Conference.

Honours and awards
 November 22, 2019 Member of the Chinese Academy of Engineering (CAE)

References

1960 births
Living people
Physicians from Liaoning
Chinese women physicians
20th-century Chinese physicians
21st-century Chinese physicians
Chinese venereologists
Members of the Chinese Academy of Engineering